Non-recursive function might refer to:
 Recursion (computer science): a procedure or subroutine, implemented in a programming language, whose implementation references itself
 μ-recursive function, defined from a particular formal model of computable functions using primitive recursion and the μ operator
 Computable function, or total recursive function, a function computable by a Turing machine

See also 

 Recursive function (disambiguation)

cs:Rekurzivní funkce